Eric Edwards (born August 4, 1980) is a former American football tight end who played for the Arizona Cardinals of the National Football League.

1980 births
Living people
Sportspeople from Monroe, Louisiana
Players of American football from Louisiana
American football tight ends
LSU Tigers football players
Arizona Cardinals players